The Headland Dixie Runners were a Minor League Baseball team based in Headland, Alabama that played in the Alabama State League/Alabama–Florida League from 1950 to 1952.

References

External links
Baseball Reference

Baseball teams established in 1950
Baseball teams disestablished in 1952
Professional baseball teams in Alabama
Defunct Alabama-Florida League teams
Defunct Alabama State League teams
1950 establishments in Alabama
1952 disestablishments in Alabama
Defunct baseball teams in Alabama
Alabama State League teams